Regina Hing Yue Tsang is a Chinese actress and singer from Hong Kong. Tsang is the 1978 Miss Hong Kong 2nd runner up. Tsang is known for Sword Stained with Royal Blood, the 1985 Wuxia TV series that was broadcast on TVB.

Career 
In 1978, Tsang competed in Miss Hong Kong Pageant and won as 2nd runner up. Tsang was defeated by Winnie Chan. It is tradition for the 2nd place winner to proceed to participate at the Miss International pageant. On November 10, 1978, Tsang represented Hong Kong in the Miss International 1978 pageant that was held at the Mielparque in Tokyo, Japan, but she was not placed. Tsang was defeated by Katherine Ruth of United States.

In 1980, Tsang started her acting career.

In 1985, Tsang is Wan Yee (or Wen Yee) in Sword Stained with Royal Blood, the 1985 Wuxia TV series (TVB) adapted from Louis Cha's novel Sword Stained with Royal Blood. Tsang's character is the daughter of Wen Fangshan.

Filmography

Films 
 1983 Gun is Law
 1983 The Temptation
 1984 The Express
 1984 The Rape After -  Li Ting Ting 
 1984 And Now What's Your Name - Francine Fan 
 1989 Banana Paradise

Television series 
 1982 Love and Passion - Tai Wan-Chi.
 1983 Farewell 19
 1983 The Legend of the Condor Heroes (list of episodes) - Lau Ying, Aunt Ying 
 1985 Sword Stained with Royal Blood - Wan Yee

References

External links 
 Hing Yue Chang at imdb.com
 Chang Hing Yue at hkcinemagic.com
 Regina Tsang at discogs.com

Hong Kong film actresses
Hong Kong television actresses
Living people
Miss International 1978 delegates
Year of birth missing (living people)